Qasemabad (also Romanized as Qāsemābād) is a village in Koshkuiyeh Rural District, Koshkuiyeh District, Rafsanjan County, Kerman Province, Iran. In the 2006 census, its population consisted of was 22 people, coming from 7 families.

References 

Populated places in Rafsanjan County